The French alexandrine is a syllabic poetic metre of (nominally and typically) 12 syllables with a medial caesura dividing the line into two hemistichs (half-lines) of six syllables each. It was the dominant long line of French poetry from the 17th through the 19th century, and influenced many other European literatures which developed alexandrines of their own.

12th to 15th centuries

Genesis

According to verse historian Mikhail Gasparov, the French alexandrine developed from the Ambrosian octosyllable,

  × –  u  – ×   –  u ×
 Aeterne rerum conditor

by gradually losing the final two syllables, 

  × –  u  – ×   –
 Aeterne rerum cond (construct)

then doubling this line in a syllabic context with phrasal stress rather than length as a marker.

Rise and decline

The earliest recorded use of alexandrines is in the Medieval French poem Le Pèlerinage de Charlemagne of 1150, but the name derives from their more famous use in part of the Roman d'Alexandre of 1170. L. E. Kastner states:

From about the year 1200 the Alexandrine began to supplant the decasyllabic line as the metre of the chansons de geste, and at the end of the thirteenth century it had gained so completely the upper hand as the epic line that several of the old chansons in the decasyllabic line were turned into Alexandrines...

These early alexandrines were slightly looser rhythmically than those reintroduced in the 16th century. Significantly, they allowed an "epic caesura" — an extrametrical mute e at the close of the first hemistich (half-line), as examplified in this line from the medieval Li quatre fils Aymon:

 o   o    o   o  o   S(e)   o  o   o o     o S
 Or sunt li quatre frère | sus el palais plenier
 
 o=any syllable; S=stressed syllable; (e)=optional mute e; |=caesura

However, toward the end of the 14th century, the line was "totally abandoned, being ousted by its old rival the decasyllabic"; and despite occasional isolated attempts, would not regain its stature for almost 200 years.

16th to 18th centuries

The alexandrine was resurrected in the middle of the 16th century by the poets of the Pléiade, notably Étienne Jodelle (tragedy), Guillaume de Salluste Du Bartas (narrative), Jean-Antoine de Baïf (lyric), and Pierre de Ronsard. Later, Pierre Corneille introduced its use in comedy. It was metrically stricter, allowing no epic caesura:

 o o o o o S | o o o o o S (e)

The classical alexandrine is always rhymed. The  (rule of alternation of rhymes), which was a tendency in some poets before the Pléiade, was "firmly established by Ronsard in the sixteenth century and rigorously decreed by Malherbe in the seventeenth." It states that "a masculine rime cannot be immediately followed by a different masculine rime, or a feminine rime by a different feminine rime." This rule resulted in the preponderance of three rhyme schemes, though others are possible. (Masculine rhymes are given in lowercase, and feminine in CAPS):
  or : aaBB
 : aBaB (or AbAb)
  aBBa (or AbbA)

These lines by Corneille (with formal paraphrase) exemplify classical alexandrines with rimes suivies:

Loosening strategies

The classical alexandrine was early recognized as having a prose-like effect, for example by Ronsard and Joachim du Bellay. This in part explains the strictness with which its prosodic rules (e.g. medial caesura and end rhyme) were kept; they were felt necessary to preserve its distinction and unity as verse. Nevertheless, several strategies for reducing the strictness of the verse form have been employed over the centuries.

Alexandrin ternaire

His famous self-descriptive line:

 o o o S | o o ¦ o S | o o o S (e)
 
 |=strong caesura; ¦=word break

Although generally embraced by the French Romantics and Symbolists, the  remained a supplemental line, used within a classical alexandrine context and forming no more than one quarter of the alexandrine lines written during this time. Passages of classical alexandrines were still written by these poets, as for example this  quatrain by Charles Baudelaire:

All three involve verse forms beyond just the alexandrine, but just as the alexandrine was chief among lines, it is the chief target of these modifications.

The works are composed of lines of various lengths, without regularity in distribution or order; however, each individual line is perfectly metrical, and the rule of alternation of rhymes is followed. The result is somewhat analogous to the Pindarics of Abraham Cowley.

The liberties taken included the weakening, movement, and erasure of caesurae, and rejection of the rule of alternation of rhymes. Although writers of  consistently continued to use rhyme, many of them accepted categories of rhyme which were previously considered "careless" or unusual. The alexandrine was not their only metrical target; they also cultivated the use of  — lines with an odd, rather than even, number of syllables. These uneven lines, though known from earlier French verse, were relatively uncommon and helped suggest a new rhythmic register.

 is the source of the English term free verse, and is effectively identical in meaning. Its birth — for the reading public at least — can be dated exactly: 1886; in this year, editor Gustave Kahn published several seminal  poems in his review , including poems by Arthur Rimbaud (written over a decade previously) and Jules Laforgue, with more following in the next years.  shed all metrical and prosodic constraints, such as verse length, rhyme, and caesura; Laforgue said, "I forget to rhyme, I forget about the number of syllables, I forget about stanzaic structure."

Notes

References

French poetry
Types of verses